Alacaluf may refer to:
 Alacalufe people or Kawésqar, a South American people living in the Chilean Patagonia
 Alacaluf language or Kawésqar, their language